The Pocatello Idaho Temple is a temple of the Church of Jesus Christ of Latter-day Saints (LDS Church) in Pocatello, Idaho.

History 
The intent to construct the temple was announced by church president Thomas S. Monson on April 2, 2017. The Pocatello Idaho Temple was announced concurrently with 4 other temples. At the time, the number of the church's total number of operating or announced temples was 182 with this announcement.

On March 16, 2019, a groundbreaking to signify beginning of construction was held, with Wilford W. Andersen of the Seventy, presiding. The groundbreaking ceremony was attended by an interfaith group and Taysom Hill of the New Orleans Saints spoke at the event. Construction is expected to last for several years and, as of August 2019, the site was noted to attract "several visitors every day".

A public open house was held from September 18 to October 23, 2021. The temple was then dedicated on November 7 by M. Russell Ballard.

See also 

 Comparison of temples of The Church of Jesus Christ of Latter-day Saints
 List of temples of The Church of Jesus Christ of Latter-day Saints
 List of temples of The Church of Jesus Christ of Latter-day Saints by geographic region
 Temple architecture (Latter-day Saints)

References

External links
Church Newsroom of The Church of Jesus Christ of Latter-day Saints

Pocatello Idaho Temple at ChurchofJesusChristTemples.org

Temples (LDS Church) in Idaho
The Church of Jesus Christ of Latter-day Saints in Idaho
21st-century Latter Day Saint temples
2021 establishments in Idaho
Religious buildings and structures completed in 2021